Daniel Dulany may refer to:

 Daniel Dulany the Elder (1685–1753)
 Daniel Dulany the Younger (1722–1797)

See also
Daniel Dulany Addison, American clergyman and writer
Daniel Delany, bishop